"Dance of the Manatee" is a song by the American art rock band, Fair to Midland. It was originally the second track on inter.funda.stifle, but was also re-recorded for Fables from a Mayfly: What I Tell You Three Times Is True. It was released as their debut single in 2007.

Music structure and composition 
"Dance of the Manatee" is a moderately fast song at 110 beats per minute and is written in the key of F minor. Most of the song uses 4/4 timing, with the exception of one measure before the last chorus that uses 5/4 timing. During the introduction the song features a four-chord refrain of F5, B5, D5, and A5, followed by a fill lasting one measure.

Song meaning 
The meaning of the song is widely disputed. Some claim that the song refers to the rant on prostitution. In an interview, Fair to Midland guitarist Cliff Campbell commented on the song, saying:

Charts

Track listing 

 Music Video "Dance of the Manatee"

References 

2007 debut singles
Fair to Midland songs
Song recordings produced by David Bottrill
2007 songs